The 1979 Auburn Tigers football team achieved an overall record of 8–3 under head coach Doug Barfield, which would be his best season as head coach.  The Tigers went 4–2 in the SEC.  They finished the season ranked #16 in the AP poll, but were not ranked in the UPI due to probation.

Prior to the start of the season, on May 11, Auburn was placed on probation by the NCAA as a result of an investigation into violations dating back to 1974.

Five players were named to the All-SEC first team for 1979: running back James Brooks, running back Joe Cribbs, linebacker Freddy Smith, defensive tackle Frank Warren, and offensive tackle George Stephenson. Joe Cribbs was also named the SEC Most Valuable Player for that year.'''

During the 1979 season, the offense used a combination of the veer and I formations and both Joe Cribbs and James Brooks gained over 1,000 yards rushing.

Schedule

Game summaries

Georgia

Roster

References

Auburn
Auburn Tigers football seasons
Auburn Tigers football